Another Earthquake! is the fourth studio album by American teen pop singer Aaron Carter, released on September 3, 2002. The album made its chart debut at number 18 on the US Billboard 200 (with 41,000 units sold), but fell to number 41 (21,000 units) in its second week. This album was much less successful than Oh Aaron, and would be Carter's third and final studio album with Jive Records.

Carter promoted the album on the Rock, Rap and Retro Tour, with Jump 5, No Secrets, and Triple Image as opening acts.

Track listing

Singles 
 "Another Earthquake!"
 "Summertime" (featuring Baha Men)
 "To All the Girls"
 "Do You Remember"

Charts

References 

2002 albums
Aaron Carter albums
Jive Records albums